Wichita Lineman was a National Hunt racehorse, foaled on 18 April 2001.

He won nine of his eighteen races, finishing second in a further four. The majority of his runs were in the hands of Tony McCoy. Wichita Lineman's final win came at the 2009 Cheltenham Festival, where he rallied from 15 to 20 lengths.

He was owned by J. P. McManus and trained by Jonjo O'Neill.

Wichita Lineman suffered a fatal fall, breaking his back at the first fence of the Irish Grand National on Monday 13 April 2009, aged 8 years, after carrying top weight in the race.

References 
2001 racehorse births
2009 racehorse deaths
Cheltenham Festival winners
Thoroughbred family 4-m
National Hunt racehorses
Racehorses bred in Ireland
Racehorses trained in the United Kingdom